

Champions
World Series: Chicago Cubs over Detroit Tigers (4-0-1)

Statistical leaders

Major league baseball final standings

American League final standings

National League final standings

Events
February 27 – The New York Highlanders acquire catcher Branch Rickey from the St. Louis Browns in exchange for infielder Joe Yeager. As a condition, Rickey specifies that he will not play on Sundays. Fritz Buelow replaces him on the Browns as their new catcher.
March 6 – John Rogers and A.J. Reach, owners of the Philadelphia Phillies, are formally acquitted in court from damages from the 1903 Baker Bowl incident. Suit had originally been filed against the owners after a balcony at the stadium collapsed. The collapse left 232 fans injured, and another 12 perished. 
April 11
Boston's American League team plays its first game with the name Red Sox. They beat the Philadelphia Athletics, 8–4, at Columbia Park.
On Opening Day, New York Giants catcher Roger Bresnahan wears shin guards for the first time in a major league game. The leg guards, usually used in cricket, come in handy, protecting Bresnahan from a fifth-inning foul tip. Other catchers will soon follow Bresnahan's lead and wear similar shin guards.
April 26 – Boston Doves outfielder Johnny Bates hits for the cycle in a 4-2 Boston victory over the Brooklyn Superbas.
May 8 – Big Jeff Pfeffer tosses a no-hitter as the Boston Doves defeat the Cincinnati Reds, 6–0.
May 10 – The Chicago White Sox purchase the contract of First baseman Jake Stahl from the Washington Senators.
June 15 – Lave Cross is released by the Washington Senators. 
June 28 – The last-place Washington Senators steal a record 13 bases off catcher Branch Rickey in a 16–5 victory over New York Highlanders. Rickey, acquired last February from the St. Louis Browns, is pressed into service despite a bad shoulder because of an injury to starting pitcher Red Kleinow. Rickey's first throw to second base ends up in right field and the subsequent tosses are not much better. He almost nips Jim Delahanty on a steal of third base. In his eight innings, relief pitcher King Brockett helps Washington with a deliberate windup. Only pitcher Long Tom Hughes and second baseman Nig Perrine are steal-less, while Hal Chase swipes one for New York.
August 2 – Walter Johnson made his major league debut with the Washington Senators and lost to the Detroit Tigers, 3–2. The first hit Johnson yielded was a bunt single by Ty Cobb.
August 11 – In the second game of a doubleheader, shortened by agreement, Ed Karger of the St. Louis Cardinals pitched a seven-inning perfect game, beating the Boston Doves, 4–0.
September 8 – Future hall of fame inductee Bill McKechnie makes his major league debut, getting one hit in four at bats. It was as a manager, that McKechnie would make his mark, winning four pennants and two World Series titles. 
September 20 – One week after recording a shutout in his major league debut, Pittsburgh Pirates pitcher Nick Maddox hurled a no-hitter against the Brooklyn Superbas in a 2–1 Pirates win. At the age of 20 years and ten months, Maddox becomes (and still is) the youngest pitcher to throw a no-hitter in major league history.
September 25 – Honus Wagner steals four bases, including second base, third base and home plate in the second inning against the New York Giants. Not to be outdone, his teammate Fred Clarke also swipes four bases for the only time in his career.
October 12 – In Game 5 of the World Series the Chicago Cubs would win their first World Championship by defeating the Detroit Tigers, 2–0.  The Cubs would take the final four games of the series after Game 1 was declared a tie due to darkness with the score knotted at 3–3 in the 12th inning.
November 5 – The New York Highlanders purchase the contract of infielder Hobe Ferris from the Boston Americans. Ferris' stay in New York as short as just hours later, he, along with infielder Jimmy Williams, and outfielder Danny Hoffman, are traded to the St. Louis Browns in exchange for Pitcher Fred Glade, outfielder Charlie Hemphill and Outfielder/infielder Harry Niles. 
November 7 – The Tigres del Licey club is founded in the Dominican Republic.
November 16 – The baseball film How Brown Saw the Baseball Game is released in theatres.

Births

January
January 2 – Ted Gullic
January 2 – Red Kress
January 14 – Chet Brewer
January 16 – Buck Jordan
January 20 – Bob Adams
January 20 – Jesse Hill
January 20 – Herm Holshouser
January 22 – Ivey Shiver
January 23 – Bobby Burke
January 25 – Jimmy Adair
January 25 – Roy Sherid

February
February 2 – Jerry Byrne
February 7 – Bill Steinecke
February 13 – Wayne LaMaster
February 17 – Orlin Collier
February 21 – Snipe Hansen
February 22 – Dan Dugan
February 22 – Marty Hopkins
February 24 – Earl Grace
February 24 – Bob Seeds
February 26 – Cy Malis
February 27 – Hilton Smith

March
March 2 – Jack Knott
March 3 – Jim Tennant
March 12 – Leroy Matlock
March 15 – Lou Fette
March 20 – Vern Kennedy
March 22 – Johnny Scalzi
March 24 – Gus Dugas
March 28 – Walt Masters

April
April 2 – Luke Appling
April 5 – John Goodell
April 5 – Sugar Cain
April 7 – Oral Hildebrand
April 7 – Leo Schrall
April 10 – Cliff Bolton
April 17 – Bobby Stevens
April 19 – Bill Ferrazzi
April 22 – Tom Lanning
April 23 – Dolph Camilli
April 25 – Roy Parmelee
April 30 – Jumbo Brown

May
May 4 – Milt Galatzer
May 6 – Ivy Andrews
May 9 – Ed Cihocki
May 11 – Rip Sewell
May 15 – Ed Baecht
May 26 – Emil Roy
May 28 – Marv Olson
May 29 – Phil Gallivan

June
June 4 – George Washington
June 6 – Bill Dickey
June 13 – Gene Desautels
June 22 – George Puccinelli
June 23 – Dusty Cooke
June 24 – Rollie Hemsley
June 26 – Debs Garms
June 28 – Joe Cascarella

July
July 5 – Bill Byrd
July 7 – Harold Greiner
July 10 – John Michaels
July 12 – Bob Cooney
July 16 – Reggie Grabowski
July 17 – Hank Patterson
July 25 – Bill Andrus
July 25 – Joe Zapustas
July 27 – Ed Carroll

August
August 4 – George Caster
August 6 – Tom Hughes
August 7 – Clarence Heise
August 11 – Jim Galvin
August 11 – Woody Jensen
August 11 – Bobo Newsom
August 11 – Gordon Rhodes
August 13 – George Susce
August 17 – Ed Durham
August 20 – Beau Bell
August 20 – Bill Crouch
August 21 – Art Garibaldi
August 21 – Wally Hebert
August 21 – Cobe Jones
August 24 – Beryl Richmond
August 25 – Rufus Meadows
August 28 – Paul Dixon
August 29 – Pep Young
August 31 – Ray Berres
August 31 – Jack Burns

September
September 2 – Ben Sankey
September 3 – Ralph Burgin
September 7 – Bill McAfee
September 8 – Buck Leonard
September 12 – Ollie Bejma
September 12 – Spud Chandler
September 13 – John Campbell
September 15 – Fritz Ostermueller
September 17 – Charlie Bates
September 27 – Josh Billings
September 27 – Walter Murphy
September 27 – Whit Wyatt

October
October 5 – Frank Doljack
October 12 – Al Smith
October 12 – Phil Weintraub
October 16 – Bill Breckinridge
October 22 - Provine Bradley
October 22 – Jimmie Foxx
October 23 – Lee Grissom
October 24 – Grant Bowler
October 28 – George Hennessey
October 31 – Ray Treadaway

November
November 1 – Larry French
November 6 – Earl Clark
November 8 – Tony Cuccinello
November 11 – Hank Erickson
November 22 – Dick Bartell
November 26 – Gowell Claset
November 28 – Lynn King

December
December 8 – Bill Beckmann
December 21 – Freddie Muller
December 26 – Harry Taylor

Deaths

January–March
January 10 – Bob Langsford, 41, shortstop for the 1899 Louisville Colonels
January 16 – Jake Evans, 50, right fielder who played from 1879 through 1885 with four National League teams
January 19 – William A. Nimick, 58, president of the Pittsburgh Alleghenys (1885–1890) and part-owner of the team
March 12 – Pat Hynes, 23, outfielder for the St. Louis Browns/Cardinals from 1903 to 1904
March 28 – Chick Stahl, 34, outfielder for Boston teams in the NL and AL, and manager of the Red Sox since August, who batted .305 lifetime; had three triples in 1903 World Series, and led AL in triples in 1904
March 29 – Doug Crothers, 47, pitcher for the 1884 Kansas City Cowboys and 1885 New York Metropolitans
March 29 – Cozy Dolan, 34, right fielder who hit .269 in 830 games for five teams from 1895 to 1906

April–June
April 16 – Bill Zies, 39, catcher for the 1891 St. Louis Browns
April 21 – Nat Hicks, 62, catcher/manager in four seasons with the New York Mutuals
April 22 – Jeremiah Reardon, 38, pitcher for the Cincinnati Red Stockings (1886) and St. Louis Maroons (1866)
May 6 – Frank Selman, 55[?], utility player from 1871 through 1875 for five teams of the National Association
May 7 – Sam Moffet, 50, outfielder/pitcher for the 1884 Cleveland Blues and 1888 Indianapolis Hoosiers
June 10 – Tun Berger, 39, catcher for the Pittsburgh Alleghenys/Pirates (1890/1891) and Washington Senators (1892).
June 12 – George Bryant, 50, second baseman for the 1885 Detroit Wolverines.
June 17 – Frank McCarton, 52, outfielder for the 1872 Middletown Mansfields
June 20 – Ezra Sutton, 56, third baseman for Boston who led the National League in hits in 1884, was fifth player to collect 1000 hits, and batted .300 three times in the National Association and four times in the National League
June 24 – Billy Klusman, 42, second baseman for the 1888 Boston Beaneaters and 1890 St. Louis Browns

July–September
July 4 – Connie McGeehan, pitcher/left fielder for the 1903 Philadelphia Athletics
July 22 – Pat Dillard, 34, OF/IF utility for the 1900 St. Louis Cardinals
August 14 – Scott Hastings, 60, catcher/outfielder/manager for seven seasons from 1871 to 1877
September 14 – Jack Wentz, 44, second baseman for the 1891 Louisville Colonels
September 21 – Claude Gouzzie, 34, second baseman for the 1903 St. Louis Browns
September 23 – Charlie Buffinton, 46, pitcher for Boston and Philadelphia teams who won 233 games, including 48 for the 1884 Boston Beaneaters

October–December
October 4 – Frank Leary, 26, pitcher for the 1907 Cincinnati Reds
October 12 – Whitey Gibson, 39, catcher for the 1888 Philadelphia Athletics
October 28 – Ted Kennedy, 42, pitcher for the Chicago White Stockings (1885) and Louisville Colonels (1886)
November 26 – Eddie Burke, 41, outfielder for the Phillies/Alleghenys/Brewers/Giants from 1890 to 1895, who topped the National League in games played (135) and times hit by pitches (25) in 1893
December 8 – Washington Fulmer, 67, outfielder for the 1875 Brooklyn Atlantics
December 27 – Jim Andrews, 42, right fielder for the 1890 Chicago Colts.
December 31 – Jocko Flynn, 43, pitcher/outfielder for the 1886 Chicago White Stockings

References